The Mourning After is the third studio album by the American metal band 40 Below Summer. The album was released on October 28, 2003 via Razor & Tie Records. Two singles were released from the album in "Self Medicate" and "Taxi Cab Confession".

During promotion of the album, 40 Below Summer appeared on Headbangers Ball, and the video for "Self Medicate" found significant airplay and the song was featured on the soundtrack for the thriller film The Texas Chainsaw Massacre. This video features the group performing the song in a city park as well as various acts of indulgent "self medication" by townspeople (i.e. secretively buying pornography, gorging on food, making out). The following year, MTV2 held a fan's choice poll for the Best Metal Videos of 2004. The results aired on the December 25 edition of Headbangers Ball with "Self Medicate" ranking in at #18.

The CD is Content/Copy-Protected with MediaMax Digital Rights Management Software on it.

Musical style 

Joey D'amico, who played guitar on the album, stated "Before, we wanted to be really heavy, but we so wanted the music to be melodic, so we'd slap those parts right next to each other. Now we learned how to meld them together to create a sound."

Reception 
John D. Luerssen of Allmusic gave the album three stars. He noted its more melodic approach, writing "while the band's forceful attack still won't land it in the pop survey, Bendeth's input does manage to give the band a foot up on other alternative metal acts in the run for airplay in the "active rock" format." Luerssen also criticized the track "Breathless", stating that it "finds the outfit capably shifting into pop ballad mode à la Creed." He goes on to write "That momentary lapse in direction is soon corrected, however, and as The Mourning After unfolds, tracks like the cathartic "F.E." and the spooky "A Season in Hell" right the wrongs for 40 Below Summer's ballooning headbanger clientele."

Track listing 

 Track 10 contains the hidden track, "The Day I Died" beginning at 11:58.

Personnel

40 Below Summer
 Max Illidge – vocals
 Joey D'Amico – guitar
 Jordan Plingos – guitar
 Hector Graziani – bass
 Carlos Aguilar – drums, piano

Additional Musicians
 Christian Machado – vocals on "F.E."

Production
 David Bendeth – production, mixing
 UE Nastasi – mastering
 Dan Korneff – engineering, mixing on "Monday Song"
 John Bender – engineering
 Nick Cohen – engineering
 Amy V. Cooper – photography
 Dan Levine – album art layout
 Carlos Aguilar – album art layout
 Hector Graziani – album art layout
 Avery Singer – album art model
 Satyakam Saha – album art sculpture

References 

2003 albums
40 Below Summer albums
Albums produced by David Bendeth
Razor & Tie albums